Rivne Oblast is subdivided into districts (raions) which are subdivided into territorial communities (hromadas).

Current

On 18 July 2020, the number of districts was reduced to four. These are:
 Dubno (Дубенський район), the center is in the town of Dubno. Dubno Raion absorbed:
Demydivka Raion 
Mlyniv Raion
Radyvyliv Raion
 Rivne (Рівненський район), the center is in the city of Rivne. Rivne Raion absorbed:
Berezne Raion
Hoshcha Raion
Korets Raion
Kostopil Raion
Ostroh Raion
Zdolbuniv Raion
 Sarny (Сарненський район), the center is in the town of Sarny. Sarny Raion absorbed:
Dubrovytsia Raion 
Rokytne Raion 
 Varash (Вараський район), the center is in the town of Varash. Varash Raion previously consisted of:
Volodymyrets Raion
Zarichne Raion

Administrative divisions until 2020

Before 2020, Rivne Oblast was subdivided into 20 regions: 16 districts (raions) and 4 city municipalities (mis'krada or misto), officially known as territories governed by city councils.

Cities under the oblast's jurisdiction:
Rivne (Рівне), the administrative center of the oblast
Dubno (Дубно)
Ostroh (Острог)
Varash (Вараш), formerly Kuznetzovsk
Districts (raions):
Berezne  (Березнівський район)
Cities and towns under the district's jurisdiction:
Berezne (Березне)
Urban-type settlements under the district's jurisdiction:
Sosnove (Соснове)
Demydivka (Демидівський район)
Urban-type settlements under the district's jurisdiction:
Demydivka (Демидівка)
Dubno (Дубенський район)
Urban-type settlements under the district's jurisdiction:
Smyha (Смига)
Dubrovytsia (Дубровицький район)
Cities and towns under the district's jurisdiction:
Dubrovytsia (Дубровиця)
Hoshcha (Гощанський район)
Urban-type settlements under the district's jurisdiction:
Hoshcha (Гоща)
 Korets (Корецький район)
 Cities and towns under the district's jurisdiction:
 Korets (Корець)
 Kostopil (Костопільський район)
 Cities and towns under the district's jurisdiction:
 Kostopil (Костопіль)
 Mlyniv (Млинівський район)
 Urban-type settlements under the district's jurisdiction:
 Mlyniv (Млинів)
 Ostroh (Острозький район)
 Radyvyliv (Радивилівський район)
 Cities and towns under the district's jurisdiction:
 Radyvyliv (Радивилів)
 Rivne (Рівненський район)
 Urban-type settlements under the district's jurisdiction:
 Klevan (Клевань) 
 Kvasyliv (Квасилів) 
 Orzhiv (Оржів)
 Rokytne (Рокитнівський район)
 Urban-type settlements under the district's jurisdiction:
 Rokytne (Рокитне)
 Tomashhorod (Томашгород)
 Sarny (Сарненський район)
 Cities and towns under the district's jurisdiction:
 Sarny (Сарни)
 Urban-type settlements under the district's jurisdiction:
 Klesiv (Клесів)
 Stepan (Степань)
 Volodymyrets  (Володимирецький район)
 Urban-type settlements under the district's jurisdiction:
 Rafalivka (Рафалівка)
 Volodymyrets (Володимирець)
Zarichne  (Зарічненський район)
Urban-type settlements under the district's jurisdiction:
Zarichne (Зарічне)
 Zdolbuniv (Здолбунівський район)
 Cities and towns under the district's jurisdiction:
 Zdolbuniv (Здолбунів)
 Urban-type settlements under the district's jurisdiction:
 Mizoch (Мізоч)

References

Rivne
Rivne Oblast